Scopula luridata is a moth of the  family Geometridae. It is found in southern Europe, Asia Minor, China, Pakistan, India, Egypt, Somalia, Yemen, Oman and Japan.

Subspecies
Scopula luridata luridata
Scopula luridata distracta (Butler, 1881) (Pakistan)
Scopula luridata sternecki Prout, 1935 (Japan)

References

Moths described in 1847
luridata
Moths of Europe
Moths of Asia
Moths of Africa